Lueyi Dovy (born 1975 in Marseille) is a French sprinter of Gabonese descent. Together with Ladji Doucouré, Ronald Pognon and Eddy De Lépine he won a gold medal in 4 x 100 metres relay at the 2005 World Championships in Athletics.

Personal bests
100 metres - 10.24 (2005)
200 metres - 20.68

Results
 2005 French Champion (Angers).
 2007 French Champion (Niort).

External links

French male sprinters
1975 births
Living people
French sportspeople of Gabonese descent
Sportspeople from Marseille
World Athletics Championships medalists
Mediterranean Games silver medalists for France
Athletes (track and field) at the 2005 Mediterranean Games
Mediterranean Games medalists in athletics
World Athletics Championships winners
Black French sportspeople